Gina Marie Mazany (born August 19, 1988) is an American mixed martial artist who competed in the Ultimate Fighting Championship (UFC). She formerly competed in King of the Cage in the Bantamweight division.

Background 
Mazany was born in Anchorage, Alaska, United States. Mazany was a figure skater when she was young. Mazany graduated from Bartlett High School. She competed her first combat sport in boxing when she was eighteen and transitioned to mixed martial arts (MMA) not long after.

Mixed martial arts career

Early career 
Mazany amassed a record of 4–0 prior joining UFC and  She won the women's bantamweight Alaska Fight Championship, beating Katie Halley in 2016.

The Ultimate Fighter 18 
On September 4, 2013, Mazany competed as a fighter on The Ultimate Fighter: Team Rousey vs. Team Tate. On one of the 16 preliminary fights,  Mazany faced Julianna Peña and she lost the fight via unanimous decision after two rounds.

Ultimate Fighting Championship 
Mazany made her promotional debut on February 19, 2017. She faced Sara McMann, replacing Liz Carmounche at UFC Fight Night: Lewis vs. Browne. She lost the fight via  submission due to an arm-triangle choke in the first round.

Her second fight in UFC came on November 25, 2017, facing Yanan Wu at UFC Fight Night: Bisping vs. Gastelum. She won the fight via unanimous decision.

On May 27, 2018, Mazany faced Lina Länsberg at UFC Fight Night: Thompson vs. Till. She lost the fight via unanimous decision.

Mazany faced Macy Chiasson on March 2, 2019, at UFC 235. She lost the fight via TKO in the first round.

On 21 January 2020, Mazany was released from the UFC.

King of the Cage 
Mazany faced Valerie Barney at King of the Cage: Golden Fights on January 25, 2020. she won the fight in round one.

Return to UFC 
Mazany faced Julia Avila on June 13, 2020, at UFC on ESPN: Eye vs. Calvillo. She lost the bout via first-round technical knockout.

Mazany faced Rachael Ostovich on November 28, 2020, at UFC on ESPN: Smith vs. Clark. She won the fight via third-round TKO from body kicks.

Mazany faced Priscila Cachoeira on May 15, 2021, at UFC 262. She lost the bout via TKO at the end of the second round.

Mazany faced Shanna Young on April 30, 2022, at UFC on ESPN 35. She lost the fight via TKO in the second round.

In May 2022, it was reported that Mazany was released from UFC.

Post UFC 
In her first bout after her UFC release, Mazany faced Elizabeth Schroder on December 9, 2022 at FAC 17, winning the bout via split decision.

Personal life 
Mazany's brother Dave Mazany is also a MMA fighter, who fights under EFC in South Africa.

After graduating from The Art Institute of Seattle, she worked as a graphic designer.

Mazany is in a relationship with UFC Flyweight fighter Tim Elliott. On July 28, 2020, Elliott announced his Instagram that he and Mazany were engaged.

Championships and accomplishments

Mixed martial arts 

 Alaska Fight Championship
 Alaska Fight Championship Women's Bantamweight Champion

Mixed martial arts record 

|-
|Win
|align=center|8–6
|Elizabeth Schroder
|Decision (split)
|FAC 17
|
|align=center|3
|align=center|5:00
|Independence, Missouri, United States
|
|-
|Loss
|align=center|7–6
|Shanna Young
|TKO (punches)
|UFC on ESPN: Font vs. Vera 
|
|align=center|2
|align=center|3:11
|Las Vegas, Nevada, United States
|
|-
|Loss
|align=center|7–5
|Priscila Cachoeira
|TKO (punches)
|UFC 262 
|
|align=center|2
|align=center|4:51
|Houston, Texas, United States
|
|-
|Win
|align=center|7–4
|Rachael Ostovich
|TKO (body kicks)
|UFC on ESPN: Smith vs. Clark
|
|align=center|3
|align=center|4:10
|Las Vegas, Nevada, United States
|
|-
|Loss
|align=center|6–4
|Julia Avila
|TKO (punches)
|UFC on ESPN: Eye vs. Calvillo
|
|align=center|1
|align=center|0:22
|Las Vegas, Nevada, United States
|
|-
|Win
|align=center|6–3
|Valerie Barney
|TKO (punches)
|KOTC: Golden Fights
|
|align=center|1
|align=center|3:22
|Grand Junction, Colorado, United States
|
|-
|Loss
|align=center|5–3
|Macy Chiasson
|TKO (punches)
|UFC 235 
|
|align=center|1
|align=center|1:49
|Las Vegas, Nevada, United States
|
|-
|Loss
|align=center|5–2
|Lina Länsberg
|Decision (unanimous)
|UFC Fight Night: Thompson vs. Till
|
|align=center|3
|align=center|5:00
|Liverpool, England
|
|-
|Win
|align=center|5–1
|Wu Yanan
|Decision (unanimous)
|UFC Fight Night: Bisping vs. Gastelum
|
|align=center|3
|align=center|5:00
|Shanghai, China
|
|-
|Loss
|align=center|4–1
|Sara McMann
|Submission (arm-triangle choke)
|UFC Fight Night: Lewis vs. Browne
|
|align=center|1
|align=center|1:14
|Halifax, Nova Scotia, Canada
|
|-
|Win
|align=center|4–0
|Katie Halley
|TKO (punches)
|AFC 124
|
|align=center|1
|align=center|2:45
|Anchorage, Alaska, United States
|
|-
|Win
|align=center|3–0
|Priscilla White
|Decision (unanimous)
|Rumble on the Ridge 27
|
|align=center|3
|align=center|5:00
|Snoqualmie, Washington, United States
|
|-
|Win
|align=center|2–0
|Jackie Mikalsky
|TKO (punches)
|TFC 6
|
|align=center|1
|align=center|1:32
|Edmonton, Alberta, Canada
|
|-
|Win
|align=center|1–0
|Violeta Rodriguez
|Submission
|AFC 50 
|
|align=center|1
|align=center|1:11
|Anchorage, Alaska, United States
|
|-

|-
|Loss
|align=center|0–1
|Julianna Peña
|Decision (unanimous)
|rowspan=3|The Ultimate Fighter: Team Rousey vs. Team Tate
| (air date)
|align=center|2
|align=center|5:00
|rowspan=3|Las Vegas, Nevada, United States
|

See also 
 List of female mixed martial artists

References

External links 
 
 

Living people
1988 births
American female mixed martial artists
Flyweight mixed martial artists
Bantamweight mixed martial artists
Lightweight mixed martial artists
Mixed martial artists utilizing boxing
Mixed martial artists utilizing Brazilian jiu-jitsu
Mixed martial artists from Alaska
American women boxers
American practitioners of Brazilian jiu-jitsu
Female Brazilian jiu-jitsu practitioners
Sportspeople from Anchorage, Alaska
Ultimate Fighting Championship female fighters
21st-century American women